Jinke Road is a station on Line 2 of the Shanghai Metro. This station, with four exits, is part of the eastern extension of Line 2 from the Zhangjiang Hi-Tech Park station, and opened February 24, 2010.

History 
By 2008, the Line 2 terminated at the  station. The opening of Jinke Road alleviated traffic away from the Zhangjiang Hi-Tech Park station and for those commuting to the nearby Pudong Software Park. The extension also included a rebuilding of the Zhangjiang Hi-Tech Park station from February 14 to February 23 to improve power supply and other equipment.

Facilities 
The station is an island platform with two tracks, one eastbound and one westbound, on either side. The station is located in Shanghai's Pudong New Area, along Zuchongzhi Road between intersections at Jinke Road and Halei Road. Roughly shaped like a rectangle, the station has four exits, two on one end, one at the other and one which exits into the Changtai Plaza shopping center. On the west end are Exits 2 and 3, and on the east side is Exit 1. Exit 4 is in the middle on the north side and leads to the neighboring Changtai Plaza. The station is served by bus routes 609 and 636.

Service 
The train operates from 5:33 to 22:48 westbound and from 6:25 to 23:40 eastbound. On weekdays, trains leave the station approximately every 3 minutes and 30 seconds during peak hours and every four to ten minutes during non-peak hours. Peak hours are defined as from 7:30 to 9:30 and 17:00 to 19:00 on Monday through Thursday, as well as 7:00 to 9:00 and 12:50 to 20:30 on Friday. On weekends, trains leave the stations every 4 minutes and 5 seconds from 8:00 to 20:30, and every five to ten minutes during other times.

References

External links 
Jinke Road at Explore Shanghai

Shanghai Metro stations in Pudong
Railway stations in China opened in 2010
Line 2, Shanghai Metro
Railway stations in Shanghai